Arjun Rampal (born 13 November 1972) is an Indian actor, television personality, model and film producer known for his work in Bollywood films. Rampal made his debut in romance Pyaar Ishq Aur Mohabbat (2001) for which he was nominated for the Filmfare Award for Best Male Debut. However the film performed poorly at the box-office as did the next two films he starred in the same year, Moksha, and Deewaanapan. The heist thriller Aankhen where he appeared opposite Amitabh Bachchan and Akshay Kumar proved to be his first commercially successful film. However Rampal's career declined as he starred in a number of films that performed poorly at the box-office such as Dil Ka Rishta (2003), Asambhav (2004), Ek Ajnabee (2005), and Darna Zaroori Hai (2006).

Rampal's breakthrough came with his appearance in the 2006 action thriller Don opposite Shah Rukh Khan and Priyanka Chopra. Rampal followed this by playing the antagonist in Om Shanti Om (2007) with Shah Rukh Khan, and Deepika Padukone. The film was the highest grossing Hindi film of the year and Rampal received critical acclaim. For his performance as guitarist Joseph "Joe" Mascarenhas in Abhishek Kapoor's musical drama Rock On!! (2008), Rampal received the Filmfare Award for Best Supporting Actor as well as the National Film Award for Best Supporting Actor. In 2010, he garnered a nomination for the Filmfare Award for Best Supporting Actor for his role as a politician in Prakash Jha's political thriller Raajneeti.

Feature films

Television

Notes

References

Indian filmographies
Male actor filmographies
Arjun Rampal